Acianthera johnsonii is a species of orchid plant native to Belize and Guatemala.

References 

johnsonii
Orchids of Central America
Orchids of Belize
Flora of Guatemala